A by-election was held for the Australian House of Representatives seat of Bruce on 28 May 1983. This was triggered by the resignation of Liberal Party MP and former Opposition Leader Sir Billy Snedden.

Results

See also
 List of Australian federal by-elections

References

1983 elections in Australia
Victorian federal by-elections
1980s in Victoria (Australia)
May 1983 events in Australia